Upper Greensand Hangers: Wyck to Wheatley is a  biological Site of Special Scientific Interest east of Alton in Hampshire. It is part of the East Hampshire Hangers Special Area of Conservation.

This site is composed of woods on the steep rocky slopes of the Upper Greensand. Bare rocks are covered by lime-loving bryophytes such as Tortula  marginata, Chiloscyphus  pallescens and Fissidens gracilifolius. There is also a population of the nationally scarce mollusc Macrogastra rolphii.

References

 
Sites of Special Scientific Interest in Hampshire